Alexander Martínez (born 23 August 1977, in Isla de la Juventud) is a Swiss triple jumper. He changed nationality from his native Cuba in 2006.

His personal best jump is 17.51 metres, achieved in July 2005 in Bern. This result places him fifth on the all-time Cuban performers list, behind Yoelbi Quesada, Lázaro Betancourt, Aliecer Urrutia and Yoandri Betanzos. While competing for Switzerland he has set a new Swiss record of 17.13 metres.

Achievements

References

1977 births
Living people
Cuban male triple jumpers
Swiss male triple jumpers
Naturalised citizens of Switzerland
Swiss people of Cuban descent
People from Isla de la Juventud